Electoral history of Richard Nixon, who served as the 37th President of the United States (1969–1974), the 36th Vice President (1953–1961); and as a two-term United States Senator (1950–1953) and Representative (1947–1950) from California.

U.S. Congressional Elections (1946-50)

U.S. House Elections (1946, 1948)

1946

1948

Nixon ran unopposed in and won the 1948 Republican primary.

U.S. Senate Election (1950)

Presidential Elections (Pre-1962)

1952 U.S. Presidential Election 
1952 Republican National Convention (Vice Presidential tally):
 Richard Nixon - 1,206 (100.00%)
1952 United States Presidential Election Results:

Source (Popular Vote): Source (Electoral Vote):

1956 U.S. Presidential Election 
1956 Republican Party presidential primaries:
 Dwight Eisenhower - 5,008,132 (85.93%)
 John W. Bricker - 478,453 (8.21%)
 Unpledged - 115,014 (1.97%)
 William F. Knowland - 84,446 (1.45%)
 Joe Foss - 59,374 (1.02%)
 S.C. Arnold - 32,732 (0.56%)
Richard Nixon - 316 (0.01%)
Others - 49,967 (0.85%)
 
1956 Republican National Convention (Vice Presidential tally):

 Richard Nixon (inc.) - 1,323 (100.00%)

1956 United States Presidential Election Results:

Source (Popular Vote): Source (Electoral Vote):

1960 U.S. Presidential Election 
1960 Republican Presidential Primaries:
Richard Nixon - 4,975,938 (86.63%)
 Unpledged - 314,234 (5.47%)
George H. Bender - 211,090 (3.68%)
Cecil H. Underwood - 123,756 (2.16%)
James L. Lloyd - 48,461 (0.84%)
Nelson Rockefeller - 30,639 (0.53%)
Frank R. Beckwith - 19,677 (0.34%)
John F. Kennedy - 12,817 (0.22%)
Barry Goldwater - 3,146 (0.06%)
Paul C. Fisher - 2,388 (0.04%)
Adlai Stevenson - 694 (0.01%)
Henry Cabot Lodge, Jr. - 514 (0.01%)
Dwight D. Eisenhower (write-in) - 172 (0.00%)
Styles Bridges - 108 (0.00%)

1960 Republican National Convention (Presidential tally):
 Richard Nixon - 1,321 (99.25%)
 Barry Goldwater - 10 (0.75%)
1960 United States Presidential Election Results:

There were 537 electoral votes, up from 531 in 1956, because of the addition of 2 U.S. Senators and 1 U.S. Representative from each of the new states of Alaska and Hawaii. (The House of Representatives was temporarily expanded from 435 members to 437 to accommodate this, and would go back to 435 when reapportioned according to the 1960 census.)
Source (Popular Vote):Note: Sullivan / Curtis ran only in Texas. In Washington, Constitution Party ran Curtis for President and B. N. Miller for vice-president, receiving 1,401 votes.
Source (Electoral Vote): (a) This figure is problematic; see Alabama popular vote above. 
(b) Byrd was not directly on the ballot. Instead, his electoral votes came from unpledged Democratic electors and a faithless elector. 
(c) Oklahoma faithless elector Henry D. Irwin, though pledged to vote for Richard Nixon and Henry Cabot Lodge, Jr., instead voted for non-candidate Harry F. Byrd. However, unlike other electors who voted for Byrd and Strom Thurmond as Vice President, Irwin voted for Barry Goldwater as Vice President. 
(d) In Mississippi, the slate of unpledged Democratic electors won. They cast their 8 votes for Byrd and Thurmond.

California Gubernatorial Election (1962)

Presidential Elections (Post-1962)

1964 U.S. Presidential Election 
1964 Republican Presidential Primaries:
Barry Goldwater - 2,267,079 (38.33%)
Nelson Rockefeller - 1,304,204 (22.05%)
James A. Rhodes - 615,754 (10.41%)
Henry Cabot Lodge, Jr. - 386,661 (6.54%)
John W. Byrnes - 299,612 (5.07%)
William Scranton - 245,401 (4.15%)
Margaret Chase Smith - 227,007 (3.84%)
Richard Nixon - 197,212 (3.33%)
 Unpledged - 173,652 (2.94%)
Harold Stassen - 114,083 (1.93%)

1968 U.S. Presidential Election 
1968 Republican Presidential Primaries:
 Ronald Reagan - 1,696,632 (37.93%)
 Richard Nixon - 1,679,443 (37.54%)
 James A. Rhodes - 614,492 (13.74%)
 Nelson A. Rockefeller - 164,340 (3.67%)
 Unpledged - 140,639 (3.14%)
 Eugene McCarthy (write-in) - 44,520 (1.00%)
 Harold Stassen - 31,655 (0.71%)
 John Volpe - 31,465 (0.70%)
 Others - 21,456 (0.51%)
 George Wallace (write-in) - 15,291 (0.34%)
 Robert F. Kennedy (write-in) - 14,524 (0.33%)
 Hubert Humphrey (write-in) - 5,698 (0.13)
 Lyndon Johnson (write-in) - 4,824 (0.11%)
 George Romney - 4,447 (0.10%)
 Raymond P. Shafer - 1,223 (0.03%)
 William W. Scranton - 724 (0.02%)
 Charles H. Percy - 689 (0.02%)
 Barry M. Goldwater - 598 (0.01%)
 John V. Lindsay - 591 (0.01%)

1968 Republican National Convention (Presidential tally):

 First ballot:
 Richard Nixon - 692
 Nelson Rockefeller - 277
 Ronald Reagan - 182
 James A. Rhodes - 55
 George Romney - 50
 Clifford Case - 22
 Frank Carlson - 20
 Winthrop Rockefeller - 18
 Hiram Fong - 14
 Harold Stassen - 2
 John V. Lindsay - 1
 Second ballot:
 Richard Nixon - 1238
 Nelson Rockefeller - 93
 Ronald Reagan - 2
1968 United States Presidential Election Results:

Source (Popular Vote): 
Source (Electoral Vote):

1972 U.S. Presidential Election 
1972 Republican Presidential Primaries:
 Richard Nixon (inc.) - 5,378,704 (86.92%)
 Unpedged - 317,048 (5.12%)
 John M. Ashbrook - 311,543 (5.03%)
 Pete McCloskey - 132,731 (2.15%)
 George Wallace - 20,907 (0.34%)
 None of the names shown - 8,916 (0.14%)

1972 Republican National Convention (Presidential tally):
 Richard Nixon (inc.) - 1,347 (99.93%)
 Pete McCloskey - 1 (0.07%)

New York Conservative Party Presidential Convention, 1972:
 Richard Nixon (inc.) - 156 (69.96%)
 John G. Schmitz - 38 (17.04%)
 Abstaining - 29 (13.00%)
1972 United States Presidential Election Results:

Source (Popular Vote): 
Source (Electoral Vote): 
(a)A Virginia faithless elector, Roger MacBride, though pledged to vote for Richard Nixon and Spiro Agnew, instead voted for Libertarian candidates John Hospers and Theodora Nathan.
(b)In Arizona, Pima and Yavapai counties had a ballot malfunction that counted many votes for both a major party candidate and Linda Jenness of the Socialist Workers Party. A court ordered that the ballots be counted for both. As a consequence, Jenness received 16% and 8% of the vote in Pima and Yavapai, respectively. 30,579 of her 30,945 Arizona votes are from those two counties. Some sources do not count these votes for Jenness.

References 

Richard Nixon
Nixon, Richard
Nixon, Richard